Andrei Olegovich Lushnikov (born 1 January 1975) is a former Russian football player.

References

1975 births
Footballers from Prague
Living people
Soviet footballers
Russian footballers
FC Asmaral Moscow players
Russian Premier League players
FC Dynamo Moscow reserves players
FC Anzhi Makhachkala players
FC Yugra Nizhnevartovsk players
Association football midfielders
FC Spartak-2 Moscow players